Listed below are the dates and results for the 1998 FIFA World Cup qualification rounds for the Asian zone (AFC). For an overview of the qualification rounds, see the article 1998 FIFA World Cup qualification.

Format
A total of 36 teams entered the competition. The Asian zone was allocated 3.5 places (out of 32) in the final tournament.

There were three rounds of play:
First round: The 36 teams were divided into 10 groups of 3 or 4 teams each. The teams played against each other twice, except in Group 10, where the teams played against each other once. The group winners advanced to the final round.
Final round: The 10 teams were divided into 2 groups of 5 teams. The teams played against each other on a home-and-away basis. The group winners qualified for the World Cup. The runners-up advanced to the AFC play-off.
Play-off: The two teams played against each other once in Malaysia. The winner qualify for the World Cup. The loser advanced to the AFC–OFC intercontinental play-offs.

First round

Group 1

Group 2

Group 3

Group 4

Group 5

Group 6

Group 7

Group 8

Group 9

Group 10

Final round

Group A

Group B

Play-off
The play-off was played over a single leg at a neutral venue.
Extra time was played using the golden goal rule.

Inter-confederation play-offs

Qualified teams
The following four teams from AFC qualified for the final tournament.

1 Bold indicates champions for that year. Italic indicates hosts for that year.

Goalscorers
There were 459 goals scored in 132 matches （including 2 international play-offs）, for an average of 3.53 goals per match.
19 goals

 Karim Bagheri

14 goals

 Kazuyoshi Miura

9 goals

 Ali Daei
 Choi Yong-soo

8 goals

 Khodadad Azizi
 Mohammed Salem Al-Enazi
 Oleg Shatskikh

7 goals

 Takuya Takagi
 Khaled Al-Muwallid

6 goals

 Hao Haidong
 Said Bayazid

5 goals

 Hidetoshi Nakata
 Jasem Al Huwaidi
 Ibrahim Al-Shahrani
 Omar Al Ariki

4 goals

 Fan Zhiyi
 Mehdi Mahdavikia
 Alireza Mansourian
 Hussam Fawzi
 Viktor Zubarev
 Bashar Abdulaziz
 Nihad Al Boushi
 Arsen Avakov
 Khamees Saad Mubarak
 Ravshan Bozorov
 Andrei Fyodorov
 Igor Shkvyrin

3 goals

 Gao Feng
 Rocky Putiray
 Widodo Putro
 Hamid Estili
 Reza Shahroudi
 Laith Hussein
 Yutaka Akita
 Wagner Lopes
 Hiroshi Nanami
 Boulat Esmagambetov
 Vladimir Loginov
 Pavel Yevteyev
 Sergey Kutsov
 Ahmed Hassan
 Mahmoud Soufi
 Obeid Al-Dosari
 Fahad Al-Mehallel
 Kim Do-hoon
 Lee Sang-yoon
 Yoo Sang-chul
 Nader Joukhadar
 Khaled Al Zaher
 Shukhrat Dzhaborov
 Takhirdjon Mouminov
 Mouslim Agaev
 Zuhair Bakheet

2 goals

 Mohammed Jewel Rana
 Hok Sochetra
 Li Bing
 Ma Mingyu
 Peng Weiguo
 Ansyari Lubis
 Ronny Wabia
 Mehrdad Minavand
 Ali Asghar Modir Roosta
 Sahib Abbas
 Qahtan Chathir
 Shoji Jo
 Hiroaki Morishima
 Masashi Nakayama
 Akinori Nishizawa
 Norio Omura
 Jeris Tadrus
 Alexei Klishin
 Nourken Mazbaev
 Fawaz Al Ahmad
 Hamed Al Saleh
 Farhat Haitbaev
 Aleksandr Merzlikin
 Abdulfattah Shehab
 Mahfood Sultan Al Araimi
 Saeed Shaaban Al Busaidy
 Majdi Shaaban Samir
 Mohammad Umer
 Zamel Al Kuwari
 Adel Khamis Al Noobi
 Fazli
 Choi Moon-sik
 Ha Seok-ju
 Seo Jung-won
 Roshan Perera
 Aref Al Agha
 Tarek Jabban
 Oumed Alidodov
 Viacheslav Knizaev
 Natipong Sritong-In
 Adnan Al Talyani
 Adel Mohamed Abdulla
 Numon Khasanov
 Sergey Lebedev
 Shukhrat Maksudov
 Abdukahhor Marifaliev
 Nikolai Shirshov

1 goal

 Khaled Al-Doseri
 Hameed Darwish
 Faisal Aziz Rashed
 Mohammed Alfaz Ahmed
 Ahmed Imtiaz
 Li Jinyu
 Li Ming
 Mao Yijun
 Su Maozhen
 Zhang Enhua
 Chen Kuei-jen
 Hsu Te Ming
 Huang Che-ming
 Lin Wen Han
 Au Wai Lun
 Cheng Sin Siu
 Lee Kin Woo
 Carlton Chapman
 Bruno Coutinho
 Raman Vijayan
 Sudirman
 Farhad Majidi
 Ali Mousavi
 Haidar Abdullah
 Ahmed Radhi
 Sadiq Saadoun
 Yasuto Honda
 Masami Ihara
 Masayuki Okano
 Naoki Soma
 Motohiro Yamaguchi
 Basam Al-Khateeb
 Hassouneh Al-Sheikh
 Ruslan Baltiyev
 Vitali Sparyshev
 Valeri Yablochkin
 Dmitri Yurist
 Faisal Al Otaibi
 Hani Al Saqer
 Jamal Mubarak
 Abdullah Saihan
 Vladimir Chertkov
 Sergei Ivanov
 Alexandr Korzanov
 Kanat Sardarov
 Rafik Yusupov
 Babkin Melikian
 Wael Nazha
 Che Chi Man
 Cheang Chon Man
 José Maria da Cruz Martins
 Idris Abdul Karim
 Azman Adnan
 Ahmad Che Zambil
 Rosdee Sulong
 Zainal Abidin Hassan
 Deepak Amatya
 Hari Khadka
 Mohamed Tayib Abdul Noor
 Farid Al Masori
 Nabeel Mubar Al Siyabi
 Zahir Rafiq
 Dahi Al Naemi
 Abdul Jaloof
 Nasir Khamees
 Waleed Bakhit Maayof
 Abdulaziz Al-Dosari
 Abdullah Al-Dosari
 Sami Al-Jaber
 Khalid Al-Temawi
 Yousuf Al-Thunayan
 Khamis Al-Zahrani
 Chuan Tan Teng
 Zulkarnaen Zainal
 Ko Jeong-woon
 Lee Min-sung
 Park Kun-ha
 Roh Sang-rae
 Anton Silva
 Chaminda Steinwall
 Redwan Abrash
 Ali Cheikh Dib
 Abdel Kader Rifai
 Ammar Rihawi
 Bashar Srour
 Loay Taleb
 Alier Achourmamadov
 Dusit Chalermsan
 Krissada Piandit
 Piyapong Pue-on
 Redjeb Agabaev
 Valeri Broshin
 Valeri Gulyan
 Djumadurdy Meredov
 Georgi Tkavadze
 Bakhit Alabadla
 Gholam Ali
 Hassan Mubarak
 Mohamed Obaid
 Ahmed Saeed
 Jafar Irismetov
 Bahtior Kambaraliev
 Mirdjalal Kasimov
 Lê Huỳnh Đức
 Nguyễn Công Vinh
 Abdul Rahman Abdulla
 Jeyeb Bashafal
 Esam Dariban
 Munif Shaef Noman
 Mohammed Zughair

1 own goal

 Sadiq Saadoun (playing against Kazakhstan)
 Raju Kaji Shakya (playing against Oman)

Notes

External links
 1998 FIFA World Cup qualification (AFC) at FIFA.com

 
FIFA World Cup qualification (AFC)
Qual